Telfer is a surname.

Telfer may also refer to:
Telfer, Western Australia, a town
Telfer Mine, a gold mine in Western Australia
Telfer School of Management at the University of Ottawa